The Parenteral Drug Association (PDA) is an international non-profit industry trade group for pharmaceutical and biopharmaceutical manufacturers.

Founded in 1946 (77 years ago) as the Parenteral Drug Association by a small group of pharmaceutical manufacturers who recognized the need for an organization to disseminate technical information within the industry, it now has more than 11,000 members worldwide.

Global Organization
PDA has members in 74 countries and regions: 
Africa
Botswana, Egypt, Ghana, South Africa, Tunisia, Zimbabwe

Asia
Bangladesh, China, India, Pakistan

Caribbean, Central, & South America
Argentina, Brazil, Colombia, Costa Rica, Dominican Republic, Paraguay
Peru, Uruguay

Europe
Austria, Belgium, Bulgaria, Croatia, Czech Republic, Denmark, Estonia,
Finland, France, Germany, Greece, Hungary, Iceland, Ireland, Italy, Kazakhstan, Latvia,
Luxembourg, Malta, Netherlands, Norway, Poland, Portugal,
Romania, Russia, Serbia, Slovak Republic, Slovenia, Spain, Sweden, Switzerland,
Ukraine, United Kingdom

Middle East
Cyprus, Iran, Israel, Jordan, Saudi Arabia, Syria, Turkey, United
Arab Emirates

North America
Canada, Mexico, Puerto Rico, United States

Pacific-Rim
Australia, Hong Kong, Indonesia, Japan,
Malaysia, New Zealand, Singapore, South Korea,
Taiwan, Thailand, Vietnam

References

Pharmaceutical industry trade groups
International medical and health organizations
International organizations based in the United States
Organizations established in 1946